Clifford Silas Smallwood (July 28, 1915 – November 14, 1979) was a farmer and served as a Canadian federal politician from 1958 to 1968.

Federal politics
Smallwood first ran as a candidate for the House of Commons of Canada in the 1957 federal election. He was defeated by incumbent Member of Parliament James A. Smith. Parliament was dissolved a year later forcing the 1958 federal election. Smallwood and Smith ran against each other again and Smallwood defeated Smith in a landslide.

Smallwood ran for a second term in the 1962 federal election; he ran against Smith for the third time and defeated him once again in another landslide victory. The minority government fell on a confidence motion a year later forcing the dissolution of parliament and the 1963 federal election. Smallwood increased the size of his majority earning the largest win of his political career. He ran for his final term in office in the 1965 federal election winning another landslide. He retired in 1968 when his electoral district of Battle River—Camrose was abolished.

Smallwood would contest the Wainwright electoral district in the 1971 Alberta general election as a member of the Progressive Conservative Association of Alberta, and would be defeated by incumbent Henry Ruste.

References

External links
 

1915 births
1979 deaths
Members of the House of Commons of Canada from Alberta
Progressive Conservative Party of Canada MPs